Rudolf Tancré ( December 24, 1842 Anklam , Pomerania - 19 September 1934 Anklam) was a German natural history dealer , ornithologist and entomologist whose Tancré Trade Company in Anklam had employed the German collector brothers Rückbeil who had made extensive collections of birds and insects while exploring the Russian Far East and the East and the South of Siberia.The Rückbeil family had contact with Grigory Grum-Grshimailo another source of expedition specimens for Tancré.

Tancré obtained specimens from Eastern Europe as well as Central Asia. He traded with European museums and private collectors, for instance Alexander Koenig and the bird curators at Tring Ernst Hartert and Karl Jordan. Insect collections were sold to various European museums and nowadays some of the collections are in the museums of Amsterdam , Bonn , Braunschweig and Linz and in the National Museum of "Grigore Antipan" in Bucharest . 
He named the butterfly Limenitis homeyeri  for one of his customers Eugen Ferdinand von Homeyer.He cowrote the original description of Perdix perdix robusta Homeyer and Tancré, 1883.

Works
Tancre, R[udolf]. Das Steppenhuhn, Syrrhaptes paradoxus, Pall., b'ei Anklam. Wien Ornith. Ver. Mitth., 12, 1888, 108-109.
Homeyer, E. F. Von, & Tancre, C. A. Beitrage zur Kenntniss der Ornithologie Westsibiriens, namentlich der Altai-Gegend. Mittheilungen des Ornithologischen Vereins in Wien 1883, pp. 81–92 NB C.A. not R.

References

Zobodat 
Angela Petrescu Bird collection of "Grigore Antipa" National Museum of Natural History, Bucharest Hausnann Collection Travaux du Muséum National d'Histoire Naturelle «Grigore Antipa» Volume 1:pp. 317–328
Horn et al., 1990: Collectiones entomologicae. Berlin. Biographies of the Entomologists of the World 
Steitor page with portrait.

German lepidopterists
1934 deaths
1842 births